Villalites is an extinct genus of small-headed flies in the family Acroceridae. It is known from Baltic amber from the Eocene, though the locality is unknown (possibly Russia). It contains only one species, Villalites electrica.

References

†
Prehistoric Diptera genera
†
†
Taxa named by Willi Hennig
Baltic amber
Eocene insects